Leptosomatidae is a family of benthic marine nematode worms.

References

Further reading
Gagarin, V.G. 2009: New Nematoda species of family Leptosomatidae (Nematoda, Enoplida) from Mediterranean Sea.  Invertebrate zoology, 5(2): 87–95. [in Russian with English abstract] PDF
De Ley, P.; Blaxter, M. L. (2004). A new system for Nematoda: combining morphological characters with molecular trees, and translating clades into ranks and taxa. Nematology Monographs & Perspectives - Proceedings of the Fourth International Congress of Nematology 8 - 13 June 2002, Tenerife, Spain. 2: 633-653.
Schmidt-Rhaesa, A. (Ed.). (2014). Handbook of Zoology. Gastrotricha, Cycloneuralia and Gnathifera: 2. Nematoda. Handbook of Zoology (2010) Walter De Gruyter: Berlin. 759 pp., available online at http://www.degruyter.com/view/product/180464
Nemaslan: Biodiversity of Antarctic Nematodes (2004).
Various Authors (2000). Nematode filing cabinet of the Marine Biology Section Ugent - in combination with the NemasLan Ms-Access database (published on CD-Rom, 2000)
Soetaert, K.; Vinckx, M.; Wittoeck, J.; Tulkens, M. (1995). Meiobenthic distribution and nematode community structure in five European estuaries. Hydrobiologia. 311 : 185-206.

Nematode families
Taxa described in 1916
Enoplia